Mis Ainak Knights ( Mis Ainak Atalān) or Mis Ainak Region is one of eight regional first-class cricket teams in Afghanistan. The region represents the following provinces in the southeast of Afghanistan, to the south of the capital Kabul: Khost, Logar, Paktia and Paktika. The team is named after Mes Aynak, an archaeological site in Logar Province.

Mis Ainak Region compete in the Ahmad Shah Abdali 4-day Tournament, which has had first-class status from 2017 onwards. In October 2017, they won their opening fixture of the tournament, against Band-e-Amir Region, by 262 runs.

They also play in the Ghazi Amanullah Khan Regional One Day Tournament, which was granted List A status from 2017. and the Afghan Shpageeza Cricket League Twenty20 competition (which has Twenty20 status from 2017) using the name Mis Ainak Knights.

References 

Cricket in Afghanistan
Afghan first-class cricket teams